The Call is a 2020 American horror film directed by Timothy Woodward Jr. and starring Lin Shaye, Tobin Bell, Erin Sanders, and Chester Rushing. The film was written by Patrick Stibbs.

Premise

After the unexpected death of an elderly woman suspected to be a witch, a group of friends who tormented her are forced to call a phone installed in her casket. To their horror someone on the other end picks up and shows them what Hell really looks like.

Cast
Lin Shaye as Edith Cranston
Tobin Bell as Edward Cranston
Chester Rushing as Chris 
Erin Sanders as Tonya 
Mike C. Manning as Zack 
Sloane Morgan Siegel as Brett 
Judd Lormand as Harliss

Release
The film was released theatrically in the United States on October 2, 2020 and on VOD on October 30, 2020. It released on Blu-ray on December 15, 2020.

Reception 
The film received mixed reviews.

Drew Tinnin of Dread Central awarded the film three stars out of five.

References

External links
 
 
 

2020 films
2020 horror films
American horror films
2020s English-language films
Films directed by Timothy Woodward Jr.
2020s American films
English-language horror films